This page is a collection of AFL Women's goalkicking records. The AFL Women's (AFLW) is Australia's national semi-professional women's Australian rules football competition. The following tables only include goals kicked in home-and-away matches and finals; goals kicked in practice matches are excluded from the totals.

Most AFL Women's goals

Below are the players who have kicked at least 50 goals at AFLW level.

Updated to the end of S7 (2022).

{| class="wikitable sortable" style=text-align:center
! class=unsortable width=6% | #
! Player
! Goals
! Club(s)
! Games
! 
! 
! Career span
! class=unsortable | 
|- style=background:#E6E6FA
| rowspan=3 | 1 || rowspan=3 align=left |  || rowspan=3 | 58 || align=left |  (2017; 4 goals, 8 games) || rowspan=3 | 61 || rowspan=3 | 0.95 || rowspan=3 | 8.29 || rowspan=3 align=left | 2017–present || rowspan=3 | 
|- style=background:#E6E6FA
| align=left |  (2018–2021; 25 goals, 29 games)|- style=background:#E6E6FA
| align=left |  (2022–present; 28 goals, 23 games)|- style=background:#E6E6FA
| rowspan=2 | 2 || align=left |  || bgcolor=D9F9E9 | 55‡ || align=left bgcolor=D9F9E9 | ‡ || 58 || 0.95 || 7.86 || align=left | 2017–present || 
|- style=background:#E6E6FA
| align=left |  || bgcolor=D9F9E9 | 55‡ || align=left bgcolor=D9F9E9 | ‡ || 50 || 1.10 || 9.17 || align=left | 2018–present || 
|- style=background:#E6E6FA
| 4 || align=left |  || bgcolor=D9F9E9 | 53‡ || align=left bgcolor=D9F9E9 | ‡ || 56 || 0.95 || 8.83 || align=left | 2018–present || 
|- style=background:#E6E6FA
| rowspan=4 | 5 || rowspan=2 align=left |  || rowspan=2 | 51 || align=left |  (2017–2019; 15 goals, 13 games) || rowspan=2 | 42 || rowspan=2 | 1.21 || rowspan=2 | 7.29 || rowspan=2 align=left | 2017–present || rowspan=2 | 
|- style=background:#E6E6FA
| align=left bgcolor=D9F9E9 |  (2020–present; 36 goals, 29 games)‡
|- style=background:#E6E6FA
| rowspan=2 align=left |  || rowspan=2 | 51 || align=left |  (2017–2018; 10 goals, 14 games) || rowspan=2 | 62 || rowspan=2 | 0.82 || rowspan=2 | 7.29 || rowspan=2 align=left | 2017–present || rowspan=2 | 
|- style=background:#E6E6FA
| align=left bgcolor=D9F9E9 |  (2019–present; 41 goals, 48 games)‡
|- style=background:#E6E6FA
| rowspan=2 | 7 || rowspan=2 align=left |  || rowspan=2 | 50 || align=left bgcolor=D9F9E9 |  (2017–2022; 50 goals, 46 games)‡ || rowspan=2 | 56 || rowspan=2 | 0.89 || rowspan=2 | 7.14 || rowspan=2 align=left | 2017–present || rowspan=2 | 
|- style=background:#E6E6FA
| align=left |  (S7 (2022)–present; 0 goals, 10 games)'|}

Club goalkicking record holders

Below are the players who hold the record for most goals kicked at their respective clubs.Updated to the end of S7 (2022)''.

See also

 AFL Women's games records
 VFL/AFL goalkicking records

References

Sources
 Every AFLW goalkicker at AustralianFootball.com

Lists of AFL Women's players
Australian rules football records and statistics